The Westminster Massacre was an incident that occurred on March 13, 1775, in the town of Westminster, Vermont, then part of the New Hampshire Grants, whose control was disputed between its residents and the Province of New York. It resulted in the killings of two men, William French and Daniel Houghton, by a sheriff's posse, after a crowd occupied the Westminster Courthouse to protest the evictions of several poor farmers from their homes by judges and other officials from New York. The Westminster Massacre is regarded by some Vermont historians as a key event in the history of Vermont.

Background 

Tensions in the New Hampshire Grants had existed since the 1760s between the majority of its residents, lower-class farmers from New Hampshire, and "Yorkers", a wealthy minority of landowners from England and New York. The New Hampshire Grants were claimed by both the Province of New Hampshire and New York. Surveyors employed by the Yorkers were often attacked and beaten by angry farmers, who formed the radical Green Mountain Boys, an anti-Yorker militia led by Ethan Allen and Remember Baker. The Green Mountain Boys began destroying the homes of Yorkers who settled in the New Hampshire Grants. Many of these Yorkers had taken land from impoverished farmers. In response to the attacks on Yorkers, officials from New York began arresting and evicting settlers across the New Hampshire Grants.

The incident 

On March 13, 1775, a group of "riotous and disorderly persons...[numbering] between eighty and ninety" assembled outside the Westminster Courthouse to protest the arrival of a judge from New York, along with several settlers from New York. In an effort to prevent "the session of the county court scheduled for the following day." Many members of the "riotous and disordley" crowd were "pro-Independence Whigs." The number of people occupying the courthouse soon numbered in the hundreds, and many were armed with clubs and firearms. The "rioters" were ordered to leave the courthouse by Sheriff William Patterson. When the rioters refused to disperse and end their "riotous assembly", Patterson rode to the town of Brattleboro, a Yorker stronghold, and recruited "25 residents for the purpose of 'keeping the peace'".

By 9:00 pm, when Patterson returned to Westminster with a posse of "60 to 70 armed men", the rioters were in control of both the courthouse and local jail. Once again, Patterson ordered the rioters to disperse, and once again the rioters refused, after which the sheriff commanded his men to fire into the courthouse to frighten the rioters. The rioters returned fire, "slightly wounding" a magistrate who had accompanied the sheriff's posse. Patterson's men proceeded to storm the courthouse, armed with swords and guns. Once they broke down the courthouse door Patterson's posse began shooting into the crowd, killing William French in the moments after they entered. French was shot five times, and died immediately. One eyewitness described the chaos that ensued:

The opposing sides fought each other in hand-to-hand combat, in which many of the rioters were injured. The rioters poured out of the courthouse as Patterson's men continued to shoot. One of the rioters, Daniel Houghton, was shot and beaten so brutally that he died from his wounds nine days later.

Aftermath: Vermont's independence 
After the massacre, seven of the rioters were caught by Sheriff Patterson's posse and thrown into the local jail. News of the massacre spread quickly throughout New England and New York, partly because many of the rioters rode to neighboring towns and told locals how the sheriff's posse had killed William French. 

The following day an angry mob of "upwards of 500", that included local farmers and teens as well as militias from the towns of Guildford, Westminster, and the counties of Windham, Bennington, and Albany, and even as far away as New Hampshire, descended upon Westminster. The mob surrounded the courthouse and "took [with them] the judges, the sheriffs, the clerk" and local Yorkers, who were paraded through town to the town jail. The mob broke into the town jail, freeing all the prisoners, including the seven rioters who had been arrested, and proceeded to lock up the officials and Yorkers they had dragged through Westminster.  The mob then searched the area for more Yorker leaders, who they captured and imprisoned in Northampton, Massachusetts. The mob continued south to Brattleboro, where they broke into the homes of prominent Yorkers, including Samuel Gale and Benjamin Butterfield, who, along with several other Brattleboro Yorkers, were brought to Northampton and imprisoned alongside others the mob had already captured.  The mob, which still numbered in the four hundreds, chased attorney Samuel Knight out of Brattleboro. Militias set up roadblocks in the countryside surrounding Westminster, who held people they believed to be loyalists or Yorker officials at gunpoint, then handed them over to search parties who brought the "Yorkers" to Northampton. A few days later, the mob created a committee who "charged" five of the prisoners with the murder of William French. 

The Westminster events so impressed Vermonters that the following year, they chose the Westminster courthouse as location for their declaration that the Vermont Republic was now an independent nation, not a colony.

See also 

List of massacres in the United States
Green Mountain Boys

Further reading
Westminster. by Rev. F. J. Fairbanks
The New England Historical and Genealogical Register

References

External links
 The Westminster Massacre
 The history Guy on "The Vermont Republic"

Conflicts in 1775
1775 in the Thirteen Colonies
Vermont in the American Revolution
Pre-statehood history of Vermont
History of the Thirteen Colonies